Charles Randolph Quirk, Baron Quirk, CBE, FBA (12 July 1920 – 20 December 2017) was a British linguist and life peer. He was the Quain Professor of English language and literature at University College London from 1968 to 1981. He sat as a crossbencher in the House of Lords.

Life and career

Quirk was born at his family's farm,  Lambfell, near Kirk Michael on the Isle of Man, where his family farmed, the son of Thomas and Amy Randolph Quirk. He attended Douglas High School for Boys on the island and then went to University College London (UCL) to read English (the department relocated to Aberystwyth due to the war) under A.H. Smith. His studies began in 1939 but were interrupted in 1940 by five years of service in Bomber Command of the RAF, where he rose to the rank of squadron leader.

Quirk became so deeply interested in explosives that he started an external degree in chemistry, but his English undergraduate studies were completed from 1945 to 1947 (with the department back in Bloomsbury) and was then invited to take up a research fellowship in Cambridge; however he took up a counter-offer of a junior lectureship at UCL, which he held until 1952. In this period he completed his MA on phonology and his PhD thesis on syntax, and in 1951 became a post-doctoral Commonwealth Fund fellow at Yale University and Michigan State University. Shortly after his return from the US in 1952, he moved to the University of Durham, becoming reader there in 1954, and professor in 1958. He returned to UCL as professor in 1960 and in 1968 succeeded Smith as Quain Professor, a post he held until 1981.

Quirk lectured and gave seminars at UCL in Old English (Anglo-Saxon) and the History of the English Language. These two disciplines were part of a ten-discipline set of final examinations in the undergraduate syllabus. At that time Old and Middle English, along with History of the English Language, were all compulsory subjects in that course. He also worked closely with A. C. Gimson and J. D. O'Connor of the Phonetics Department, sometimes sitting in as an examiner for Phonetics oral examinations.

In 1985, he was awarded the honorary degree of Doctor of Letters by the University of Bath.

Survey of English Usage
In 1959, Quirk founded the Survey of English Usage, working with Valerie Adams, Derek Davy and David Crystal; they sampled written and spoken British English produced between 1955 and 1985. The corpus comprises 200 texts, each of 5,000 words. The spoken texts include dialogue and monologue, and the written texts material intended for both reading and reading aloud. 

The project was to be the foundation of A Comprehensive Grammar of the English Language, a widely used reference grammar and the first of English in real use rather than structured by rules derived from Greek and Latin models. Quirk and his collaborators proposed a descriptive rather than prescriptive grammar, showing readers that different groups of English speakers choose different usages, and argued that what is correct is what communicates effectively. The work was groundbreaking; one proposed flaw is that the examples used were written by the scholars, not collected from texts, as preferred by one of the tutors at the Summer School, Edward Black.

Summer School of English

One of Quirk's favourite enterprises was the London University Summer School of English, where the above-mentioned colleagues and other budding scholars and friends of his came to teach for a month. It was considered the most eminent body of English teachers anywhere in the world. The resident students were foreign academics, teachers and students. He threw himself into the social life with gusto and enjoyed singing Victorian ballads in a Cockney accent over a "couple of pints". When the School moved away from Queen Elizabeth College to New Cross, numbers fell rapidly. The next and last successful director was the phonetician J. D. O'Connor.

Awards
Quirk was appointed a Commander of the Order of the British Empire (CBE) in the 1976 New Year Honours, and was knighted in 1985. He had openly been a Labour supporter all his life, although he sat in the House of Lords as a cross-bench peer. He was President of the British Academy from 1985 to 1989 and became a life peer as Baron Quirk, of Bloomsbury in the London Borough of Camden on 12 July 1994. He sat on the boards of Pearson Education and the Linguaphone Institute.

Personal life
Until his death, in 2017, he resided in Germany and England. His second wife was the German linguist Gabriele Stein. She died on 6 March 2020.

Publications

Books

Forewords
 Jan Marsh, Spoken, Broken and Bloody English: The Story of George Bernard Shaw, Linguaphone and Eliza Doolittle, London: Linguaphone Institute, 2002.

References

External links
Photograph, 1970, with Greenbaum, Svartvik and Leech
Photograph, 1983: Svartvik, Crystal, Greenbaum, Leech and Quirk

Obituary Sidney Greenbaum, 1996
Parliamentary record

1920 births
2017 deaths
Anglo-Saxon studies scholars
Alumni of University College London
Linguists from the United Kingdom
Commanders of the Order of the British Empire
Life peers created by Elizabeth II
Crossbench life peers
Fellows of King's College London
Harkness Fellows
Knights Bachelor
Manx writers
Michigan State University alumni
Yale University alumni
Linguists of English
Vice-Chancellors of the University of London
People educated at King William's College
Presidents of the British Academy
Academics of University College London
Fellows of the British Academy
Royal Air Force personnel of World War II
Royal Air Force squadron leaders